Miquon station is a suburban commuter railroad station on the SEPTA Manayunk/Norristown Line, located at River and Manor Roads in the Miquon section of Whitemarsh Township,  Montgomery County, Pennsylvania, United States. It is the first station on the line outside Philadelphia. 

In FY 2013, Miquon station had a weekday average of 483 boardings and 452 alightings.

The station is adjacent to a large office park (River Park I and II), which was redeveloped from a former paper mill in 1999. As of April 2013, parking includes about 60 spaces adjacent to the tracks along River Road, and 170 spaces in the River Park II lot; the latter lot has been shrinking in size due to the expansion of a private school (AIM Academy) which leased most of the River Park II complex beginning in 2011. 

The station building on the outbound side is leased to an outside party and does not currently sell tickets. There is a shelter on the inbound side; connecting the two platforms is an official pedestrian crossing.

Miquon is expected to become a temporary turnback point for trains at times when the line is flooded by the Schuylkill River around Spring Mill and Conshohocken. A new remotely controlled interlocking has been built near the station for this purpose, as part of a project to install a modern cab signal system on the line.

Station layout

References

External links

SEPTA – Miquon Station
 Station House from Google Maps Street View
 Miquon Station House 2000 image by Mark Lehman (Existing Railroad Stations in Montgomery County, Pennsylvania)

SEPTA Regional Rail stations
Former Reading Company stations
Railway stations in the United States opened in 1910
Railway stations in Montgomery County, Pennsylvania
1910 establishments in Pennsylvania